Dominique Gaigne (born 3 July 1961 in Pacé, France) is a former French professional road bicycle racer. He won one stage in the 1983 Tour de France and wore the yellow jersey for one day in the 1986 Tour de France. After retiring from competition he became a builder.

Major results

1983
Le Horps
Vuelta a España:
Winner prologue
Tour de France:
Winner stage 5
1986
Tour du Limousin
Tour de France:
Wearing yellow jersey for one day
1989
Binche - Tournai - Binche

References

External links 

Official Tour de France results for Dominique Gaigne

1961 births
Living people
French male cyclists
French Tour de France stage winners
French Vuelta a España stage winners
Sportspeople from Ille-et-Vilaine
Cyclists from Brittany